

Hirose U.FL, I-PEX MHF, AMC or UMCC is a miniature RF connector for high-frequency signals up to 6 GHz manufactured by Hirose Electric Group, I-PEX, and others.

U.FL connectors are commonly used in applications where space is of critical concern, such as in smartphones and Laptop WiFi cards. U.FL connectors are commonly used inside laptops and embedded systems to connect the Wi-Fi antenna to a Mini PCI, Mini PCIe or M.2 WiFi card. Another common use is connecting GPS antennas.

Female U.FL connectors are not designed with reconnection in mind, and they are only rated for a few reconnects (approximately 30 mating cycles) before replacement is needed. The female U.FL connectors are generally not sold separately, but rather as part of a pigtail with a high-quality 1.32 mm doubly shielded cable, which allows for a low-loss connection.

The male connectors are surface-mounted and soldered directly to the printed circuit board. They are designed to have a characteristic impedance of 50 ohms. The mated connection is only 2.5 mm high and takes as little as 9 mm2 (3.0 × 3.1 mm2) of board space.

Much like many other electronic components, Hirose U.FL connectors were protected by patents and trademarks. However, compatible third party connectors are available under many other names, e.g. Sunridge MCB.

Hirose W.FL

The Hirose W.FL, also known as Amphenol AMMC, is an ultra small RF connector used in handheld electronic products. It is manufactured by  Hirose Electric Group and has a frequency range up to 6 GHz. Compared to its predecessor U.FL it occupies even less area (2.0 mm diameter) and height (1.4 mm).

Like U.FL, W.FL also has many more names assigned to it by those producing compatible connectors.

Notes

References

External links
 U.FL Series
 SMT Ultra-Miniature Coaxial Connectors
 UMCC — Ultraminiature Coax Connector and Cable Assembly Series
 Official website

RF connectors